Stauntonia coriacea, commonly known as blue china vine, is a woody evergreen climbing vine indigenous to temperate east Asia. It produces white monoecious flowers followed by pink colored sausage-shaped fruits with white colored pulps. The fruits are  berries. They ripen and drop at autumn. The fruits are edible, but is not commonly used as food. It is often grown as ornamental plant. The leaves have a waxy texture.

References

Lardizabalaceae